The 2000 Southland Conference men's basketball tournament took place March 8–11, 2000. The quarterfinal round was played at the home arena of the higher seeded-teams, with the semifinals and championship game played at Hirsch Memorial Coliseum in Shreveport, Louisiana. Number 7 seed Lamar won the championship game over number 4 seed , 62–55.

The Cardinals earned the conference's automatic bid to the NCAA tournament where they lost in the opening round to No. 1 overall seed Duke.

Format
The top eight eligible men's basketball teams in the Southland Conference receive a berth in the conference tournament.  After the conference season, teams were seeded by conference record.

Bracket

Sources
Southland Conference archives

References

Tournament
Southland Conference men's basketball tournament
Southland Conference men's basketball tournament
Southland Conference men's basketball tournament